The Gentry County Courthouse is a historic courthouse located at Albany, Gentry County, Missouri. It was designed by the architectural firm Eckel & Mann and built in 1884-1885 by Rufus K. Allen.  It is a two-story, High Victorian or Ruskinian Gothic style brick building with a central tower.  It has a symmetrical plan, semi-elliptical arches, and a prominent hipped slate roof.

It was listed on the National Register of Historic Places in 1980.

References

County courthouses in Missouri
Courthouses on the National Register of Historic Places in Missouri
Victorian architecture in Missouri
Gothic Revival architecture in Missouri
Government buildings completed in 1885
Buildings and structures in Gentry County, Missouri
National Register of Historic Places in Gentry County, Missouri